John Duncan (1848 – 2 February 1924) was a Reform Party Member of Parliament in New Zealand.

Born in Dundee, Scotland, in 1848, Duncan emigrated with his family to New Zealand in 1851, and was educated at Nelson College from 1863 to 1864.

He was elected to the Wairau electorate in the 1908 general election, when he defeated former Mayor of Blenheim Robert McArtney. Duncan was defeated in 1911 by Richard McCallum.

He died at Picton on 2 February 1924 and was buried at Picton Cemetery.

References

1848 births
1924 deaths
Politicians from Dundee
Scottish emigrants to New Zealand
People educated at Nelson College
Reform Party (New Zealand) MPs
New Zealand MPs for South Island electorates
Members of the New Zealand House of Representatives
Unsuccessful candidates in the 1911 New Zealand general election
Unsuccessful candidates in the 1914 New Zealand general election
Unsuccessful candidates in the 1905 New Zealand general election
Unsuccessful candidates in the 1902 New Zealand general election
Unsuccessful candidates in the 1896 New Zealand general election
Unsuccessful candidates in the 1893 New Zealand general election
Burials at Picton Cemetery
19th-century New Zealand politicians